is a proposal to organize Japan into one circuit (dō) of Hokkaido and several new states (shū) that are each a combination of several prefectures. The states and circuit are proposed to have greater regional autonomy, similar to the United Kingdom. It was proposed by the Junichiro Koizumi administration, but has yet to materialize.

Most of the political parties in 2012 supported this reform.

History 
An early proposal to replace the prefectures with states (-shū) and transform Japan into a federal state was Ueki Emori's 1881 draft constitution (:ja:東洋大日本国国憲按, Tōyō Dai-Nihon-koku kokken-an), one of the more well-known and radical manifestations of the many so-called "private" (i.e. not government-sponsored) constitutional drafts that sprang from the Freedom and People's Rights Movement in the 1880s.

See also
 Chukyo Metropolis proposal

References

External links
The Future of Japan: A Case for Abolishing Prefectures and Establishing States

Government of Japan
Federalism by country